The first season of The Unit originally aired between March 7, 2006 and May 16, 2006, it introduces the members of The Unit and their families. As the season progresses various plots and story arcs are explored, such as Tiffy Gerhardt's affair with Colonel Tom Ryan and Molly Blane's mission to find the army widow who conned her out of her savings. In the United States, the first season of The Unit averaged 15.5 million viewers and was the fourteenth most watched show during the 2005–2006 television season.

Cast and characters

Main cast 
 Dennis Haysbert as Sergeant Major Jonas Blane, aka Snake Doctor
 Regina Taylor as Molly Blane
 Robert Patrick as Colonel Thomas Ryan, aka Dog Patch
 Audrey Marie Anderson as Kim Brown
 Max Martini as Master Sergeant Mack Gerhardt, aka Dirt Diver
 Abby Brammell as Tiffy Gerhardt
 Michael Irby as Sergeant First Class Charles Grey, aka Betty Blue
 Demore Barnes as Sergeant First Class Hector Williams, aka Hammerhead
 Scott Foley as Staff Sergeant Bob Brown, aka Cool Breeze

Recurring cast 
 Alyssa Shafer as Serena Brown
 Michael O'Neill as Ron Cheals
 Christina Gianaris as Mandy
 Danielle Hanratty as Lissy Gerhardt
 Kavita Patil as Sergeant Kayla Medawar
 Sammi Hanratty as Jenny Gerhardt
 Gale Morgan Harold III as Rory
 Karl Makinen as Coots
 Mary B. McCann as Ruth Cheals

Episodes

References

External links 
 
 

2006 American television seasons
The Unit seasons